Teal is a surname and a given name which may refer to:

People

Surname
Teal is an English surname.

 Clare Teal (born 1973), English jazz singer
 Gordon Kidd Teal (1907–2003), developed the first silicon transistor
 Jeff Teal (born 1960), American ice hockey forward
 Larry Teal (1905–84), American saxophonist
 Quinton Teal (born 1984), American football defensive back
 Ray Teal (1902–76), American actor
 Robert Teal (born 1967), former Australian rules footballer
 Skip Teal (1933–2006), Canadian ice hockey player
 Vic Teal (born 1949), Canadian ice hockey player
 Willie Teal (born 1957), American football cornerback

Given name
 Teal Bunbury (born 1980), Canadian-American soccer player
 Teal Fowler (born 1970), American ice hockey player and coach
 Teal Marchande (born 1965), American actress
 Teal Redmann (born 1982), American actress
 Teal Sherer, American actress
 Teal Wicks (born 1982), American singer and stage actress

Fictional characters
 Claud Eustace Teal, a policeman foil for the character Simon Templar, created by Leslie Charteris
 the eponymous heroine of Belle Teal, a 2001 novel by Ann M. Martin
 A title character of The Adventures of Abney & Teal, children's television programme.
 Diplomatic Officer Chloe Alice Teal, from the British science fiction television series Hyperdrive

See also
 Teale
 Tele (disambiguation)

Given names derived from birds
Unisex given names